Mykola Velychkivsky (January 11, 1889, Zhytomyr – July 1, 1976, Irvington, US) was an economist, professor, Ukrainian politician and statesman, and chairman of the .

Early life and World War I 
He was born on January 11, 1889 (although according to his Soviet passport it was January 11, 1882), in the family of deacon Ivan Kuzmich Velychkivsky. He graduated from the three-year church-parochial school at the Kiev Dormition Church in Podil and Zhytomyr Theological School. From 1905 he studied at the Volyn Theological Seminary in Zhytomyr. In 1909 he graduated from four classes of the theological seminary and entered the Economics Department of the Kiev Commercial Institute.

In June 1913 he graduated from the Kiev Commercial Institute with the degree of Candidate of Economic Sciences.

From 1913 he served as an ensign-gunner of the 5th Artillery Brigade of the Russian Army, a participant in World War I. In 1916 he graduated from the three-month school for staff of liaison officers in Kiev. In 1917 he served as a staff-captain of the 10th Siege Division in Altinovka, Chernihiv province.

From September 1917 he worked as the head of the Department of the Agricultural Economy of the General Secretariat of Land Affairs of the Central Council, and vice-director and director of the Department of the Agricultural Economy of the Ministry of Land Affairs of the UPR. In 1918, he worked in the statistical department of the cooperative committee. Then, he was again the director of the Agricultural Economy Department. Then he worked for a while as head of the department at the People's Commissioner of Land Affairs of the Ukrainian SSR and headed the subsection on the agricultural economy of the Scientific Agricultural Committee of Ukraine. During the Denikin occupation of Kiev in 1919, he joined the illegal Committee of the People's Defense of Ukraine.

Between the wars 
At the end of 1919 he taught economic geography in agricultural courses at the Kiev Provincial Land Department. In 1920 he worked as the head of the workers' and peasants' university named after Taras Shevchenko in Bila Tserkva, and taught at the higher three-year pedagogical courses in Bila Tserkva. From 1924 he was the director of the Belotserkovsk Secondary Trade and Industrial Vocational School. Also from 1925 to 1927, he taught in the pedagogical and agricultural technical schools in Bila Tserkva. In June 1927 he was arrested for two weeks by the Bilotserkivsky SPD. From 1927 to 1928 he worked in a lecture bureau in the city of Kiev.

From 1928 to 1929 he was a professor and head of the Department of Agricultural Cooperation and Reconstruction of Agriculture at the Kamyanets-Podilsky Agricultural Institute. In October 1929 he was imprisoned in the case of the Union for the Liberation of Ukraine (ULU) and until March 1930 he was in prison in Bila Tserkva.

In 1930 he worked as the head of the educational institutions (technical colleges) of the trust of the Dnieper Electric Complexes of the People's Commissariat of Land Affairs of the Ukrainian SSR. From 1930 to 1931 he worked as a professor of Agricultural Economics and Statistics at the Zhytomyr Institute of Industrial Crops. At the same time, he was a professor and head of the Statistics Department of Lugansk Cooperative Institute.

From 1932 to 1934 he worked at the higher educational institutes of Kamianets-Podilskyi as head of the Statistics Department of the Kamyanets-Podilsky Institute of Poultry, professor of Statistics at the Institute of Technical Cultures, professor of Economic Statistics at the Pedagogical Institute, and teacher at the collective-tractor school.

In 1935–1936 he was the head of the Department of Organization of Poultry Industry Enterprise and the dean of the Zootechnical Faculty of the Rozsoshan Poultry Industry Institute of the Voronezh region of the RSFSR. From 1936 to 1937 he was the head of the department of Agricultural Economy and Organization of Agricultural Enterprise of the Azov-Black Sea Agricultural Institute in Novocherkassk. At the same time, he taught statistics at the Financial and Economic Institute of Rostov-on-Don. From 1937 to 1938 he taught accounting at the special-purpose faculty in Kiev.

In March 1938, he was arrested by the NKVD. He was in prison until March 1939, when he was released by the decision of the Kyiv Regional Court. For some time he was treated in Kiev and Zhytomyr and was unemployed. In August 1939, he was arrested again by the NKVD and held in prison until February 1940. For some time he worked in the library on Bay Mountain in Kiev, and until June 1941 was an economist at a construction materials trust in Kiev.

World War II and later life 
During Nazi occupation from 1941 to 1942 he was the rector of the Kiev Polytechnic Institute, but did not actually work. He also worked as a director of the Institute of Economics, Statistics and Geography at the Ukrainian Academy of Sciences in Kiev.

As a non-party figure, he became the chairman of the Ukrainian National Council in Kiev, established on October 5, 1941, by the Ouns of the Melnik direction. This symbolized the continuity of the state tradition. The UNC consisted of 130 delegates who represented all Ukrainian lands and was not a one-party formation. It was composed of members with different political positions, from hetmans to nationalists. The core was the presidium, which, besides Velychkivsky, included engineer Anton Baranovsky, geologist Ivan Dubina, and OUN leader Osip Boidunik.

At a press conference, together with Bagaziy and Melnik they proclaimed that there was only one legal chairman of Ukraine, as well as the restoration of Ukrainian statehood, which was negatively received by the German authorities. On February 6, 1942, the Kiev Gestapo arrested Velychkivsky, but the Reichsminster of the occupied eastern territories, Alfred Rosenberg, ordered him released from prison. From 1942 to 1943 he worked as a scientific adviser and professor of training courses at the Ukrainian Corporation (Scientific Institute of Agrarian and Agricultural Organization) in Kiev. From 1943 he stayed illegally in Lutsk, Uman and Lviv.

In April 1944, Velychkivsky headed the updated UNC in Lviv. He was a member of the Literary and Art Club in Lviv.

In July 1944 he emigrated to Krakow and Tarnów, then moved to Bratislava and was subsequently forcibly taken to Strasshof in Austria. Until April 1945 he worked at a paint shop in Melendorf, Austria, and then moved to Germany (Aukirch and Mittenwald in Bavaria). In 1945 he became a professor and Head of Statistics at the Ukrainian Higher School of Economics in Munich and a professor at the Ukrainian Institute of Engineering and Technology in Munich.

In 1951, Velychkivsky and his wife moved to the United States and lived with their daughter Irena Karpenko in New Jersey. there, he was involved in the active intellectual life of the SSS, studying economics and writing many reports, including "Agricultural Policy in Ukraine in the Aftermath of its Liberation from the Soviet Occupation". At the 1961 World Congress of Ukrainian Science in New York, he delivered the report "The Soviet Experiment with Agronomists". He also published a book on the destruction of agriculture by the Soviet authorities. In addition, he edited the Ukrainian Quarterly, where he published his own materials. Despite his old age, he led an active social and scientific life.

In the post-war period, he sought to bring together different factions of the Ukrainian liberation movement. Although he belonged to the "Melnik" faction, he was also published in "Bandera" publications, for example, in the journal The Liberation Way, where, in 1965, his memoirs "The Sad Times of the German Occupation (1941–1944)" were published.

Velychkivsky died in July 1976.

Posthumous honors
On February 19, 2016, the 3rd Chervonoarmeysky Lane in Zhytomyr was renamed Mykola Velichkivskyi Lane on the order of the Mayor of Zhytomyr.

Sources
 Nikolay Velichkovsky. Under two occupations. Memories and documents. – SSS. New York, 2017.
 Nikolay  Velichkovsky. The sad times of the German occupation in 1941–1944 // Liberation Path, London, 1965, No. 1 (203) -10 (211).
 Koval. Velichkivskyi Mykola // Encyclopedia of the History of Ukraine: in 10 volumes / edited by: VA Smoly (chairman) and others. ; Institute of History of Ukraine NAS of Ukraine. – K.: Sciences. Opinion, 2003. – Vol. 1: A – V. – P. 471. – 688 p. : il. – .
 Vladimir Kosik. Ukraine during the Second World War, 1938–1945. – Kiev – Paris – New York – Toronto, 1992.
 Gritsak Yaroslav. Essay on the history of Ukraine. Formation of the modern Ukrainian nation of the 19th–20th centuries. – K.: Genesis, 1996.
 A small dictionary of Ukrainian history / answers. ed. VA Smoly. – K.: Libid, 1997. – 464 p. – .

References

Velychkivsky, Mykola
Velychkivsky, Mykola
Politicians from Zhytomyr
20th-century Ukrainian economists
Soviet emigrants to the United States